The water skiing competition at the 2022 World Games took place in July 2022, in Birmingham, Alabama in United States, at the Oak Mountain State Park.
Originally scheduled to take place in July 2021, the Games were rescheduled for July 2022 as a result of the 2020 Summer Olympics postponement due to the COVID-19 pandemic.

Participating nations

Medal table

Events

Men

Women

References

External links
 The World Games 2022
 International Waterski and Wakeboard Federation
 Results book

 
2022 World Games
2022 in water skiing